Cotesia perspicua is a species of wasp in the genus Cotesia. It was identified by Christian Gottfried Daniel Nees von Esenbeck in 1834.

Distribution 
It is found in: Azerbaijan, Belarus, Belgium, China, Croatia, Czech Republic, Czechoslovakia, Finland, France, Georgia, Germany, Hungary, Italy, Kazakhstan, Latvia, Moldova, Netherlands, Poland, Romania, Russia, Slovakia, Spain, Spain-main, Sweden, Switzerland, Tajikistan, Ukraine, United Kingdom, Uzbekistan and Yugoslavia.

Web of life 
Its life web consists of 74 partners.

References 

Microgastrinae
Insects described in 1834